Alain Simard may refer to:
 Alain Simard (businessman), Québécois businessman of production company Équipe Spectra
 Alain Simard (director), Québécois television director, musician, singer, and songwriter who remade the theme song for La Job